The following Confederate States Army units and commanders fought in the First Battle of Kernstown of the American Civil War. The Union order of battle is shown separately.

Abbreviations used

Military rank
 MG = Major General
 BG = Brigadier General
 Col = Colonel
 Ltc = Lieutenant Colonel
 Maj = Major
 Cpt = Captain
 Lt = Lieutenant

Other
 w = wounded
 mw = mortally wounded
 k = killed

Valley District, Department of Northern Virginia
MG Thomas J. Jackson

References
 Kernstown Battlefield Association

American Civil War orders of battle